Miami Township, Ohio may refer to:
Miami Township, Clermont County, Ohio
Miami Township, Greene County, Ohio
Miami Township, Hamilton County, Ohio
Miami Township, Logan County, Ohio
Miami Township, Montgomery County, Ohio

See also
 Miami Township (disambiguation)

Ohio township disambiguation pages